Faulkner University is a private Christian university in Montgomery, Alabama. It is affiliated with the Churches of Christ.

History
The university was founded in 1942 by Dr. Rex Turner, Dr. Leonard Johnson and Joe Greer as Montgomery Bible School. In 1953 the school's name was changed to Alabama Christian College (ACC'')'. In 1965, the college was moved to its present location on Atlanta Highway. The year 1975 marked the beginning of the school's satellite campuses in Mobile, Huntsville and Birmingham. In 1985, the school was renamed Faulkner University''' in honor of James H. Faulkner, a longtime supporter and chairman of the board.

Accreditation
Faulkner University is accredited by the Commission on Colleges of the Southern Association of Colleges and Schools to award associate, baccalaureate, master's, a doctorate in humanities, a doctorate in biblical studies, and juris doctor degrees.

Tuition and financial aid 
In the 2017-2018 award year, Faulkner University had 1,700 students receiving Federal Pell Grants, totaling $7,229,388.

Athletics
The Faulkner athletic teams are called the Eagles. The university is a member of the National Association of Intercollegiate Athletics (NAIA), primarily competing in the Southern States Athletic Conference (SSAC; formerly known as Georgia–Alabama–Carolina Conference (GACC) until after the 2003–04 school year) for most of their sports since the 1999–2000 academic year; while its football team competes in the Sun Division of the Mid-South Conference (MSC), starting since the 2016 fall season.

They were also a member of the National Christian Collegiate Athletic Association (NCCAA), primarily competing as an independent in the South Region of the Division I level; which they won the national championship in baseball in 2001.

Faulkner competes in 12 intercollegiate varsity sports: Men's sports include baseball, basketball, cross country, football, golf and soccer; while women's sports include basketball, cross country, golf, soccer, softball and volleyball. Club sports include bass fishing, cheerleading and eSports.

Notable alumni and faculty
Alumni
Bobby Bright  United States Congressman from Alabama
 Marcus Brimage  professional Mixed Martial Artist, former UFC competitor
Corey Black Baseball, Chicago Cubs
Ray Ray Armstrong Football, New York Giants
Austin Adams - Major League Baseball

Faculty
Allison Garrett  Associate Professor of Law (200407)
Michael A. O'Donnell  Assistant Professor of Family Studies, Dean of Professional Studies

Graduate programs

Law
Faulkner operates the Thomas Goode Jones School of Law, with between 200 and 300 students. The school of law was provisionally accredited by the American Bar Association in 2006, and fully accredited in 2009.

Theology
The Kearley Graduate School of Theology, which opened the fall of 2013, offers students Masters of Arts degrees in Biblical Theology, as well as a low-residency PhD in Biblical Studies.

Humanities
Faulkner University teaches from the canon of literature known as the Great Books of the Western World. Students attending Faulkner University are able to obtain a low-residency master's degree or a PhD in the Humanities through the university's Honors College.

See also
Amridge University

References

External links

 
 Official athletics website

 
1942 establishments in Alabama
Council for Christian Colleges and Universities
Educational institutions established in 1942
Southern States Athletic Conference
Universities and colleges accredited by the Southern Association of Colleges and Schools
Universities and colleges affiliated with the Churches of Christ
Private universities and colleges in Alabama
Universities and colleges in Montgomery, Alabama